HD 895  is a multiple star system in the constellation Andromeda. Its apparent magnitude is 6.277, so it can be seen by the naked eye under very favourable conditions.

The first pair is made of a primary yellow giant star of spectral type G0III, and the secondary subgiant star of spectral type K2IV, so they have both left the main sequence evolutionary phase. They are also both more massive than the Sun. The secondary completes an orbit around the primary every 421 years.

The second pair is a double-lined spectroscopic binary located 18 arcseconds away from the first pair, although with an apparent magnitude of 10.37 it is too faint to be seen without a telescope. It was not recognized as a separate pair in the old Bright Star Catalogue and Henry Draper Catalogue, thus it bears the designation HD 895C. They are both G-type main sequence stars slightly less massive than the Sun, with spectral types G7V and G8V respectively. They complete an orbit around their center of mass approximately every 6 days.

Using Gaia parallax, instead, the pair formed by the primary and the secondary is much closer than previous measures, at an estimated distance of 175 light years. The two pairs, then, may be not gravitationally bound.

References

Andromeda (constellation)
000895
G-type giants
0040
001076
Durchmusterung objects
Multiple stars